Wheelerenomyia is an extinct genus of flies in the family Dolichopodidae, known from the Eocene of the Baltic region. The genus was first described in 1907 by Fernand Meunier, who named it after William Morton Wheeler. It is close to the Mesorhagini.

Species 
The genus contains 15 species. Originally it had only one species, W. eocenica; in 2008, Igor Grichanov moved 14 extinct species from other sciapodine genera (Amesorhaga, Nematoproctus, Psilopus – now Sciapus – and Neurigona) to the genus. All species in the genus have strongly sinuate vein M, and were found from Baltic amber.

 †Wheelerenomyia bickeli (Negrobov & Selivanova, 2003)
 †Wheelerenomyia corcula (Meunier, 1907)
 †Wheelerenomyia eocenica Meunier, 1907
 †Wheelerenomyia longicerca (Negrobov & Selivanova, 2003)
 †Wheelerenomyia originaria (Meunier, 1907)
 †Wheelerenomyia pacata (Meunier, 1907)
 †Wheelerenomyia parca (Meunier, 1907)
 †Wheelerenomyia parva (Meunier, 1907)
 †Wheelerenomyia parvula (Meunier, 1907)
 †Wheelerenomyia pellucida (Meunier, 1907)
 †Wheelerenomyia perastutula (Meunier, 1907)
 †Wheelerenomyia perattica (Meunier, 1907)
 †Wheelerenomyia quadrispinosa (Negrobov & Selivanova, 2003)
 †Wheelerenomyia subparva (Meunier, 1916)
 †Wheelerenomyia vladimiri (Negrobov & Selivanova, 2003)

References 

†
†
Prehistoric Diptera genera
Eocene insects